The Fidalgo River is a river of Piauí state in northeastern Brazil.

See also
List of rivers of Piauí

References
Brazilian Ministry of Transport

Rivers of Piauí